is a small near-Earth asteroid that passed about  from Earth's center on 28 November 2022 at 02:24 UTC. It was discovered by the Pan-STARRS 1 survey telescope at Haleakalā Observatory, Hawaii on 26 November 2022.

References

External links 
 
 
 
 Flyby animation by Tony Dunn
 Asteroid (NEO) 2022 WM7

Minor planet object articles (unnumbered)
20221128
20221126